icare is a state-run, insurance corporation. It is owned by the New South Wales Government.

Its primary purpose is to provide workplace injury insurance.

History 
It was formed in September 2015 through the commencement of the State Insurance and Care Governance Act

It succeeded the since-abolished WorkCover Authority of New South Wales. This followed a recommendation that WorkCover have its insurance and workplace safety investigation roles separated.

In 2020 a joint investigation by ABC News and The Age found that the organization was losing hundreds of millions of dollars per year, and had serious mismanagement issues.

Governance 
Its board is accountable to the Treasurer of NSW, who appoints the board and CEO.

See also 

 WorkCover Authority of New South Wales

References 

Insurance companies of Australia
Companies based in New South Wales
Government-owned companies of New South Wales
Australian companies established in 2015
Financial services companies established in 2015